They Came From the Sun is the second and last album by British post-hardcore band Yourcodenameis:Milo. The album was released on 2 April 2007 under V2 Records. The song "Understand" was originally called 'Second Mater Responds' in relation to the song 'First Mater Responds' which featured on their mini-album "All Roads to Fault". The title was changed to 'Understand' shortly before the album's release.

Videos were made for the singles, "Understand" and "I'm Impressed". "Translate" was released as a free download from the band's website with downloadable artwork.

Track listing
 "Pacific Theatre" – 3:45
 "All That was Missing" – 4:49
 "Understand" – 3:47
 "I'm Impressed" – 4:39
 "About Leaving" – 3:16
 "Sixfive" – 4:30
 "Translate" – 4:03
 "Evening" – 5:18
 "Take to the Floor" – 4:53
 "To The Cars" – 4:39
 "Screaming Ground" – 4:20
 "Dicta Boelcke" – 1:30

References

2007 albums
Yourcodenameis:milo albums
V2 Records albums